Boyalıtepe (formerly Gameni or Kamani) is a village in the central district (Karaman) of Karaman Province, Turkey. It is situated to the east of Karadağ an extinct volcano. The population of the village was 321 as of 2011. The village was founded in the 18th century by Bekdik tribe of Turkmens  who had migrated from Kaman. The former name Gamani may refer to Kaman. Initially it was a neighbourhood of a nearby village. But in 1935 it was issued from the nearby village and was declared a village named Boyalıtepe referring to a hill in the village which is covered by rubia.

References

Villages in Karaman Central District